Eucereon myrina is a moth of the subfamily Arctiinae. It was described by Herbert Druce in 1884. It is found in Arizona, Mexico and Guatemala.

References

 

myrina
Moths described in 1884